Guilt is a Scottish thriller and mystery series, which was the first drama commission of the new BBC Scotland channel and first broadcast there before being broadcast on BBC Two. Written and created by Neil Forsyth, the show initially centres on two brothers, played by Mark Bonnar and Jamie Sives, who get involved in a hit and run, before involving a large number of cast in an ongoing story. The first series of Guilt was broadcast in 2019, and the second series broadcast in the autumn of 2021. The show was a critical hit and was subsequently broadcast around the world including in America (PBS), France (Arte), Australia (BBC First), Sweden (Sveriges Television), Germany (Arte), Portugal (RTP2) and South Africa (Showmax).

A third and final series was confirmed by the BBC in May 2022.

Cast
 Mark Bonnar as Max
 Jamie Sives as Jake
 Ruth Bradley as Angie
 Sian Brooke as Claire
 Ellie Haddington as Sheila Gemmell
 Sara Vickers as Erin
 Emun Elliott as Kenny
 Bill Paterson as Roy Lynch (series 1)
 Moyo Akandé as Tina
 Noof McEwan as Cameron
 Phyllis Logan as Maggie
 Greg McHugh as Teddy
 Stuart Bowman as Roy Lynch (series 2)
 Ian Pirie as Sandy
 Gregor Firth as Archie

Production
Forsyth was keen to write a show about siblings, which he has called "the most interesting dramatic relationship", and a show with a leitmotif that ran through all the characters, in this case guilt.  He spent several years developing the show before finding a home for it at the BBC. Guilt was produced by Happy Tramp North and Expectation Entertainment. It was directed by Robert McKillop.

Guilt became the first drama commission for the new BBC Scotland channel, which premiered the show's episodes a week before UK-wide transmission on BBC Two.

Guilt was shot in Edinburgh and Glasgow. In Edinburgh, locations included Calton Hill and Charlotte Square. In Glasgow, a studio was built at Parkhouse Business Park and other locations included Clydebank Docks, Glasgow Caledonian University, Aberfoyle and the Lanarkshire town of East Kilbride.

A second series of Guilt was confirmed by the BBC in July 2020, and filming began in Scotland in November 2020. New cast members included Phyllis Logan, Sara Vickers, Stuart Bowman and Iain Pirie. The second series was directed by Patrick Harkins.

Plot
The show begins with two brothers, Max and Jake, in a car returning from a wedding. When they accidentally run over and kill an elderly man on an Edinburgh street, they make the decision to try to cover up the crime.  As the show progresses, the brothers’ difficulties intensify and the story opens up to bring in other characters and storylines, within a narrative theme of guilt.

Reception
Guilt received strong viewing figures and a highly positive critical reception. The Times called it, "An absolute cracker", The Observer, "an utter triumph, a word-of-mouth dazzler", with "welcome Coen brothers echoes". The Telegraph called it a "stealth hit" which "felt like Fargo relocated to Leith, or Midnight Run reimagined by Irvine Welsh". The Independent termed it "the unexpected treat of the year”, The Guardian described it as a "darkly delicious tale" that was "fast becoming a word-of-mouth hit", the Radio Times called it "Hitchcockian" and The Herald deemed it the most impressive Scottish small screen debut since the 1987 comedy-drama Tutti Frutti.

The second series was equally well received. The Sunday Times called it "irresistible, just as good as the original", The Herald said it was "among the realms of modern television classics", The Times called it "magnificent, a Scottish Fargo", The Guardian "witty and scintillating", and The Scotsman, "one of Scotland’s most acclaimed television dramas".

Awards
The first series of Guilt was nominated for a large number of awards and won 2020 Best Drama at the Scottish BAFTA Awards, the Royal Television Society of Scotland Awards, the Celtic Media Festival, and the Broadcast Digital Awards.

International broadcasts
Guilt has been broadcast widely around the world. It was broadcast on BBC First in Australia where The Australian called it "clever, stylish and absorbing". In France it was retitled Petit Meurtre Entre Frères (A Small Murder Between Brothers) by Arte. It was retitled Vår Lilla Hemlighet (Our Little Secret) by SVT in Sweden, where Aftonbladet called it "exemplary television craftsmanship". It was broadcast in South Africa by Showmax. In Germany it was retitled Keiner ist schuld (Nobody Is Guilty) by Arte, where Die Rheinpfalz said "this combination of tragedy and humour is a high art, which succeeds here".

In America, Guilt premiered on the PBS Network's Masterpiece Mystery series in September 2021. The New York Times called it "tense but textured" with characters that are "funny and well-drawn"  while NPR said Guilt had "a verve that made me think of the TV series Fargo, which I mean as high praise".

Indian version
In August 2021, it was announced that Guilt was being remade in Hindi by Applause Entertainment, starring the Indian actors Jaideep Ahlawat and Mohammed Zeeshan Ayyub.

References

External links
 
 
 

2010s British comedy-drama television series
2020s British comedy-drama television series
2019 British television series debuts
BBC Scotland television shows
Television shows set in Edinburgh
Television series by BBC Studios